The Georges River, also known as Tucoerah River, is an intermediate tide-dominated drowned valley estuary, located to the south and west of Sydney, New South Wales, Australia.

The Georges River is the main tributary of Botany Bay; with the Cooks River being a secondary tributary.

The land adjacent to the Georges River was occupied for many thousands of years by the Tharawal and Eora peoples. They used the river as an important source of food and a place for trade.

Geography

At Glenfield it reaches the urban environment and then travels to Liverpool where the river turns east and flows past the suburbs of East Hills, Lugarno, and Blakehurst, before emptying into Botany Bay at Taren Point in the southern suburbs of Sydney, where it joins with the estuarine catchment.

Major tributaries include O'Hares Creek, Bunbury Curran Creek, Cabramatta Creek, Lennox River (proposed), Prospect Creek, Salt Pan Creek and the Woronora River. The Georges River is popular for recreational activities such as water skiing and swimming. The banks of the river along the lower reaches are marked by large inlets and indentations overlooked by steep sandstone ridges and scarps, many being home to expensive residential properties.

The Georges River features some artificial lakes in the suburb of Chipping Norton, near Liverpool. These lakes, known as the Chipping Norton Lakes, are the result of sand mining and quarrying operations in the twentieth century. The Lakes are now a popular watersports and recreational facility for the residents of the south-western suburbs of Sydney.

Liverpool Weir now forms the uppermost tidal limit and presence of salt water on the Georges River.

[From Appin to Glenfield, a large corridor has been protected as part of the Georges River Regional Open Space Corridor. Council reserves allow for access to natural sections of the river at Simmo's Beach, Ingleburn Reserve, Keith Longhurst Reserve, and Frere's Crossing.

Botany Bay Community River Health Monitoring Program  is a community-based initiative to monitor ecosystem health catchment.

History

Aboriginal history
Prior to the arrival of Europeans, Georges River was formerly known as Tucoerah River by the traditional custodians of the area.

European history
The Georges River was given its English name in honour of King George III, by Governor Arthur Phillip. It was one of the many sites of the Hawkesbury and Nepean Wars, a series of wars between the Kingdom of Great Britain and the resisting Indigenous clans in the late 1700s and early 1800s.

The river was explored by Bass and Flinders in 1795 on their first voyage on the Tom Thumb after their arrival in New South Wales.  The exploration led to the establishment of Bankstown .

A dam was constructed by David Lennox using convict labour at Liverpool in 1836, as a water supply to Liverpool.

In February 2007, Liverpool and Campbelltown City Council were awarded a $2 million grant from the NSW Environmental Trust under their Urban Sustainability Initiative. The grant was to allow the councils, in conjunction with Wollondilly Shire Council and the Georges River Combined Councils Committee, to develop a Comprehensive Strategic Plan focused on the rehabilitation of the catchment area.

Crossings 

Bridges over the Georges River include from east to west:
 Captain Cook Bridge (connecting Sans Souci to Taren Point), for cars, pedestrians and cyclists.
 Tom Uglys Bridge (connecting Blakehurst to Sylvania), for cars, pedestrians and cyclists.
 Old Como railway bridge, now for pedestrians and cyclists.
 Como railway bridge on the Illawarra line, connecting Oatley to Como, for trains.
 Alfords Point Bridge (connecting Padstow Heights to Alfords Point), for cars, pedestrians and cyclists.
 East Hills rail bridge at East Hills, for the Airport & South Line
 Voyager Point footbridge, for pedestrians and cyclists.
 M5 South Western Motorway Georges River East Bridge
 Milperra Bridge (Newbridge Rd connecting Moorebank to Milperra), for cars, pedestrians and cyclists.
 Governor Macquarie Drive bridge (connecting Warwick Farm to Chipping Norton), for cars, pedestrians and cyclists.
 Liverpool Weir - built 1836
 Liverpool footbridge (now demolished which utilised the footing of the decommissioned railway bridge to Holsworthy).
 Newbridge Rd (connecting Liverpool to Chipping Norton), for cars, pedestrians and cyclists.
 M5 South Western Motorway Georges River West Bridge
 Airport & South Line rail bridge (connecting Holsworthy to Glenfield), for trains.
 Cambridge Ave Causeway (connecting Holsworthy to Glenfield), for cars.
 King Falls Bridge

Fish 

The Georges River is a popular area for recreational fishing.  Species present in the river include bass, bream, whiting, yellowtail, jewfish and flathead.  The river is also host to a number of commercial oyster farms.  The upper ends of the Georges River are abundant with Bass during the summer months and during the winter months these bass migrate down to the lower ends of the river towards the salt water to breed.  Waste water inflows to the river are carefully managed to maintain the estuarine habitat.

See also

 Dharawal National Park
 List of rivers in Australia
 List of rivers in New South Wales (A-K)
 Rivers of New South Wales
 Geography of Sydney

References

External links
 
  [CC-By-SA] Series of articles about Georges River history
  [CC-By-SA]
  [CC-By-SA]
 Guide to Sydney Rivers site

 
Botany Bay
Rivers of Sydney